Elvis Dominguez is an American college baseball coach and former shortstop, who is the current head baseball coach of the Bradley Braves. He is the 15th head coach all time for the Bradley Braves, and in 2015 lead the Bradley Braves to their first regional in 40 years.

Playing career
Dominguez grew up in Cienfuegos, Cuba. He enrolled at Creighton University to play college baseball for the Creighton Bluejays baseball team.

As a freshman at Creighton University in 1983, Dominguez had a .237 batting average, a .462 on-base percentage (OBP) and a .339 SLG.

As a sophomore in 1984, Dominguez batted .304 with a .511 SLG, 4 home runs and 20 RBIs.

In the 1985 season as a junior, Dominguez hit 3 home runs and 9 doubles.

Dominguez had his best season as a senior in 1986, having career highs in doubles (13), home runs (8), RBIs (38), batting average (.348) and slugging (.613).

Coaching career
In 1987, Dominguez became a graduate assistant for Creighton. After two seasons with the Bluejays, he accepted the head coaching position at Omaha Central High School. Dominguez lead Omaha Central for three seasons and, serving as a Spanish teacher, returned to Creighton as an assistant. He then spent 4 years as an assistant at the University of Iowa, where he instructed infielders, hitting and recruiting.

On August 13, 2001, Dominguez was introduced as the head coach for Eastern Kentucky Colonels.

On June 24, 2008, Dominguez was named the head coach at Bradley. During the 2015 season, he guided the Braves back to the NCAA Tournament for the first time since 1968.

In September 2018, Dominguez was invited to the White House by President Trump as an influential Hispanic person in the United States.

Head coaching record

See also
 List of current NCAA Division I baseball coaches

References

External links
Bradley Braves biography

Living people
Baseball shortstops
Creighton Bluejays baseball players
Creighton Bluejays baseball coaches
High school baseball coaches in the United States
Iowa Hawkeyes baseball coaches
Eastern Kentucky Colonels baseball coaches
Bradley Braves baseball coaches
1963 births
Cuban baseball coaches
People from Cienfuegos
Cuban emigrants to the United States
Texas Rangers scouts
Christopher Columbus High School (Miami-Dade County, Florida) alumni